Giardini is a surname of Italian origin. Notable people with the surname include:

 Anne Giardini (born 1959), Canadian lawyer and an author
 Eliane Giardini (born 1952), Brazilian actress
 Felice Giardini (1716–1796), Italian composer and violinist
 Giuliano Giardini (born 1955), retired Italian alpine skier

Italian-language surnames